Ahammadkati (also spelled Ahammedkati or Ahmadkati) is a village and mouza in Gaurnadi Upazila in the Barisal District of southern-central Bangladesh.

Geography
The settlement lies in the Ganges Delta.

Transport
To the east of Ahammadkati is the N8 highway which, via Gaurnadi and Bachhar, connects the village with Barisal in the south.

References

Populated places in Barisal District